Tmeticodes is a monotypic genus of Japanese sheet weavers containing the single species, Tmeticodes gibbifer. It was first described by H. Ono in 2010, and is only found in Japan.

See also
 List of Linyphiidae species (Q–Z)

References

Linyphiidae
Monotypic Araneomorphae genera
Spiders of Asia